Mehr Khalid Mahmood Sargana is a Pakistani politician who was a Member of the Provincial Assembly of the Punjab, from 2002 to May 2018.

Early life and education
He was born on 1 January 1968.

He graduated in 1992 from University of the Punjab and has the degree of Bachelor of Arts.

Political career
He was elected to the Provincial Assembly of the Punjab as a candidate of Pakistan Muslim League (Q) (PML-Q) from Constituency PP-77 (Jhang-V) in 2002 Pakistani general election. He received 37,172 votes and defeated Abol-Hassan Ansari, a candidate of Muttahida Majlis-e-Amal (MMA). In the same election, he ran for the seat of the Provincial Assembly of the Punjab as an independent candidate from Constituency PP-78 (Jhang-VI) and for the seat of the National Assembly of Pakistan from Constituency NA-89 (Jhang-IV) but was unsuccessful. He received 539 votes from Constituency PP-78 (Jhang-VI) and lost the seat to Zahoor Ahmed Sajid Janjua, a candidate of National Alliance. He received 122 votes from Constituency NA-89 (Jhang-IV) and lost the seat to an independent candidate, Muhammad Azam Tariq.

He was re-elected to the Provincial Assembly of the Punjab as a candidate of PML-Q from Constituency PP-78 (Jhang-VI) in 2008 Pakistani general election. He received 27,286 votes and defeated Mian Zahoor Sajid, an independent candidate.

He was re-elected to the Provincial Assembly of the Punjab as a candidate of Pakistan Muslim League (N) (PML-N) from Constituency PP-79 (Jhang-VII) in 2013 Pakistani general election. He received 29,101 votes and defeated an independent candidate, Ghazanfar Abbas Shah.

References

Living people
Punjab MPAs 2013–2018
1968 births
Pakistan Muslim League (N) politicians
Punjab MPAs 2002–2007
Punjab MPAs 2008–2013